The West Lancashire Railway (WLR) ran northeast from Southport to Preston in northwest England.

History

Construction was started by Samuel Swire the Mayor of Southport, on 19 April 1873. It opened on 15 September 1882.
A branch was constructed from Penwortham to the Blackburn line at Whitehouse Junction allowing direct services from East Lancashire Railway to Southport.

In 1881 a further branch was constructed from east of Hesketh Bank station southwards to Tarleton Lock on the Rufford Branch of the Leeds and Liverpool Canal by the River Douglas. This was mainly intended for goods, but a passenger service did run on the branch until 1912/3. The branch closed completely in 1930.

Expansion, bankruptcy and take-over

It also sponsored the Liverpool, Southport and Preston Junction Railway, opened in 1887 to provide greater access to Liverpool (in competition with its rival the Lancashire and Yorkshire Railway) and in an attempt to forge a commercial alliance with the Manchester, Sheffield and Lincolnshire Railway.  At one time the line featured as a potential alternative route to Blackpool.  The line was never successful and its construction bankrupted the West Lancashire Railway.  Finally in 1897 the two railways were taken over by their competitor, the Lancashire and Yorkshire Railway.

Up to the take-over, the WLR used its own stations at each terminus.  These were Central station in Southport and Fishergate Hill in Preston.  The new owners built a west-to-north connecting chord at Whitehouse Junction which enabled them to redirect all of the WLR passenger trains into their own Preston (ELR) Station. Likewise at the Southport end, passenger trains were rerouted into the adjacent Chapel Street Station.  Both WLR termini became goods depôts with that at Preston seeing occasional passenger use when it played host to special services during the Preston Guild.

Electrification

Closure

Hundred End station closed in 1962. Passenger services, including the electric ones, ceased in September 1964 (as a result of the Beeching Axe) and most of the line was closed. The line was quickly lifted beyond Hesketh Park in 1965. A goods service to Hesketh Park continued until November 1967, and the remaining track was lifted in late 1968- though a small stump remained in place as far as Roe Lane in Southport until the very early 1970s as part of the complex of Meols Cop electric depot.

References

Notes

Sources
 Biddle, G., (1989), The Railways Around Preston - A Historical Review, Scenes from the Past: No. 6, Foxline Publishing, 
 Brookes, G. (2004) History, New Longton On-Line, www page, accessed 6 February 2007
 Cotterall, J.E., (1982), The West Lancashire Railway, The Oakwood Press, 
 
 
 
 Nock, O.S. (1969), The Lancashire and Yorkshire Railway - A Concise History, Ian Allan, 
 Robertson, B. (2003-2007) St. Lukes to Preston Whitehouse North Jn., (including Whitehouse West Jn. to Todd Lane Jn., Whitehouse South Jn.), British Railways Routes in 1960, www page, accessed  6 February 2007
 Taylor, S. (1996), Journeys by Excursion Train from East Lancashire: Southport via the West Lancashire Line ... , Scenes from the past, No. 26, Part 2, Foxline Publishing,

External links
 http://www.disused-stations.org.uk/
 http://www.rcts.org.uk/railways%20around%20preston.htm
 http://www.southportpast.com/altcarbob.shtml
 http://www.heskethbank.com/history/photos/railway.html

Historic transport in Merseyside
Closed railway lines in North West England
Lancashire and Yorkshire Railway
Historic transport in Lancashire